Fuchouia is an extinct genus of trilobite in the family Dolichometopidae. There are about 11 described species in Fuchouia.

Species
These 11 species belong to the genus Fuchouia:

 † Fuchouia bulba Peng et al., 2004
 † Fuchouia chiai Lu, 1957
 † Fuchouia elongata Lu & Qian, 1974
 † Fuchouia kuruktagensis Zhang, 1981
 † Fuchouia manchuriensis (Walcott)
 † Fuchouia oratolimba Yang, 1977
 † Fuchouia prompta (Zhou, 1974)
 † Fuchouia quadrata Endo & Resser
 † Fuchouia quadratoglabella Yang et al., 1993
 † Fuchouia sixinensis Peng et al., 2004
 † Parafuchouia prompta (Zhou, 1974)

References

Dolichometopidae
Articles created by Qbugbot